Francisco Audenino (died 1964) was an Argentine film actor who appeared in around fifty productions, generally in supporting roles.

Selected filmography
 Our Land of Peace (1939)
 The Three Rats (1946)
 Dance of Fire (1949)
 Valentina (1950)
 Dark River (1952)
 The Count of Monte Cristo (1953)
 Behind a Long Wall (1958)

References

Bibliography 
 Borrás, Eduardo. Las aguas bajan turbias. Editorial Biblos, 2006.

External links 
 

Year of birth unknown
1964 deaths
Argentine male film actors
Argentine male stage actors